Munnad  is a village in Kasaragod district in the state of Kerala, India.

Transportation
This village is connected to Karnataka state through Panathur. There is a 20 km road from Panathur to Sullia & Bandadka to Sullia in Karnataka from where Bangalore and Mysore can be easily accessed. Locations in Kerala can be accessed by driving towards the western side. The nearest railway station is Kanhangad railway station on Mangalore-Palakkad line. There are airports at Mangalore, Kannur and Calicut.

Demographics
As of 2011 Census, Munnad had a population of 8,612 with 4,111 males and 4,501 females. The average female sex ratio was 1095 higher than the state average of 1084. 10.3% of the population was under 6 years of age. Munnad had an average literacy of 85% lower than the state average of 94%; male literacy was 89.65% and female literacy was 80.84%.

Education
 People Institute of Management Studies, Munnad
 Peoples Co-operative Arts and Science College, Munnad

References

Panathur area